The hispid hare (Caprolagus hispidus), also called Assam rabbit and bristly rabbit, is a leporid native to South Asia, whose historic range extended along the southern foothills of the Himalayas. Populations experienced a continuing decline in suitable habitat due to increasing agriculture, flood control, and human development. It is therefore listed as Endangered on the IUCN Red List since 1986. It is the only species in the genus Caprolagus.

Characteristics
The hispid hare has a harsh and bristly coat. Its ears are very short and do not project beyond the fur. The coat is dark brown on the back due to a mixture of black and brown hairs; brown on the chest and whitish on the abdomen. Females weigh in average , including a heavily pregnant female weighing  in this statistical mean weight.

The frontal bones are very wide. The occipito-nasal length generally exceeds . There is no clear notch in front of postorbital processes.

Distribution and habitat
The historical range of the hispid hare extended from Uttar Pradesh through southern Nepal, the northern region of West Bengal to Assam and into Bangladesh. Today, its distribution is sporadic in Bangladesh, India, Nepal and Bhutan. It inhabits tracts of early successional tall grasslands and takes refuge in marshy areas or grasses adjacent to river banks during the dry season, when these areas are susceptible to burning.
The population in the extensive grasslands of Shuklaphanta National Park may be of international significance. 

In January 2016, a hispid hare was recorded in Chitwan National Park for the first time since 1984.

Ecology
The hispid hare is most active at dawn and dusk. The limited information available on reproduction indicates that its average litter size is small.

References

Mammals described in 1839
Mammals of Asia
Mammals of Bhutan
Mammals of India
Mammals of Nepal
Leporidae